Bir Muktijoddha Sirajul Islam Stadium is located by the Panchagarh Sadar Upazila Engineer Office in Panchagarh, Bangladesh.

See also
 Stadiums in Bangladesh
 List of cricket grounds in Bangladesh

References

Cricket grounds in Bangladesh
Football venues in Bangladesh